
Year 128 BC was a year of the pre-Julian Roman calendar. At the time it was known as the Year of the Consulship of Octavius and Rufus (or, less frequently, year 626 Ab urbe condita) and the First Year of Yuanshuo. The denomination 128 BC for this year has been used since the early medieval period, when the Anno Domini calendar era became the prevalent method in Europe for naming years.

Events 
 By place 
 Roman Republic 
 Cn. Octavius and T. Annius Rufus are this year's consuls

 Bactria 
 The Greco-Bactrian kingdom is overrun by the Tokhari.

 Parthia 
 Artabanus II becomes king of Parthia (approximate date)

 China 
 In response to Han incursions, in 128 or 127 the Xiongnu invade northern China. They kill the governor of Liaoxi, defeat the governor of Yuyang, carry off 2000 of the inhabitants of Liaoxi and Yuyang and defeat the Han general Han Anguo. Han Anguo and his cavalry force are surrounded in their camp, but the arrival of relief forces coming from Yan causes the Xiongnu army to withdraw. The Xiongnu also invade Yanmen and kill or carry off 1000 people.
 The Han general Wei Qing, with an army of 30,000 cavalrymen, defeats a Xiongnu army north of Yanmen. The Han general Li Xi attacks the Xiongnu further to the east, riding out of Dai Prefecture.
 Having spent a year in Greater Yuezhi, the Han diplomat Zhang Qian begins his return journey to China, having failed to persuade Yuezhi's king to form an alliance against the Xiongnu. Passing by the Pamir, Kunlun, Altun and Qilian Mountains, he and his retinue are then captured by the Xiongnu and taken into custody.

 By topic 
 Arts and sciences 
 Limenius composes the Second Delphic Hymn.

Births 
 Liu Ju, Chinese prince of the Han Dynasty (d. 91 BC)

Deaths 
 Liu Fei, Chinese prince of the Han Dynasty (b. 169 BC)
 Phraates II, king of Parthia (approximate date)

References